Roopbaan, founded in 2014, was a Bengali language LGBT-focused magazine in Bangladesh, the first of its kind. It also organizes projects and events, runs a website, and describes itself as a "non-profit, non-political, volunteer-based platform for LGBT individuals and their allies." Roopban's print magazine and public events were disrupted when co-founder and publisher Xulhaaz Mannan was murdered in 2016, though the last issue of this magazine was published in August 2014.

Bangladeshi researcher and writer Hadi Hussain described the public impact of Roopban in Gaylaxy magazine:
"When Roopbaan was launched back in 2014 ... the most striking thing for me was the fact that it was a Bengali language magazine printed into hard copies. The message was clear – instead of limiting it to a virtual English-centric socially privileged group, the magazine aimed to reach the average Bengali speaking literate person with a message of diversity, tolerance and acceptance. It was no less than a heroic attempt to do so as it not only increases the visibility but also one’s vulnerability, especially in a society where state’s inability to control Islamist militant groups had already created a dangerous nexus for local human rights defenders. But all this couldn’t deter…[Roopban]…from doing their work as they continued to arrange social support group meetings, workshops, talks, trainings and rainbow rally to claim the space denied to individuals who don’t subscribe their lives and identities to the hetero-normative rules of the world."

Name 
Roopbaan says its name means "fabulous and beautiful person." According to The Dhaka Tribune, the magazine is named after "the Bengali folk character Roopbaan symbolising the power of love." AFP describes "Roopbaan" as "the name of a Bengali fairytale of a beautiful young girl married to a boy."

Print magazine 
The magazine published its 56-page first issue in January 2014. There were 600 copies printed, with copies priced at Tk100. According to The Dhaka Tribune, Roopbaan was "taking submissions from volunteer contributors. It includes articles, photography and personal accounts of the volunteers." The launch garnered both local and international coverage.

The second issue was published in August 2014, after this no new issue was published. There were 700 copies printed, with copies priced at Tk150.

According to Raad Rahman in The Guardian, co-founder and publisher Xulhaaz Mannan announced that "Roopbaan’s printers had received warnings against printing the magazine but assured us that keeping a low profile would ensure the magazine’s survival…[but] the printers would cancel their contract with Roopbaan within a week, after receiving death threats if collaborations continued." Rahman quotes an anonymous source who writes “Roopbaan was discussed in a government cabinet meeting and the magazine was placed in front of the prime minister…She was obviously not happy to see it. Then…the local newspapers stated that the government intelligence is looking for us."

Mannan was murdered by Islamist extremists in 2016, putting an end to the print magazine.

Book
Roopbaan published Roopongti, a book of Bengali queer poetry, in February 2015.

Projects and events
Roopbaan also organized regular projects and events:
 In 2014, Roopban worked with Boys of Bangladesh to conduct a national survey of lesbian, gay, and bisexual Bangladeshis.
 Between 2014 and 2015, it organized Pink Slip, a sexual health and safety outreach program.
 In 2015 and 2016, it organized a youth leadership program in Dhaka.
 It organized "Rainbow Rally" pride parades in 2014 and 2015.
 In 2014 and 2015, it organized a drag show and a transgender/transvestite fashion show.
 From 2013 to 2015, it ran an annual Ramadan iftar, which it described as "LGBTQ-inclusive."

See also
 LGBT rights in Bangladesh
 Xulhaz Mannan
 Attacks by Islamic extremists in Bangladesh

References

External links
 Roopbaan.org

2014 establishments in Bangladesh
2014 disestablishments in Bangladesh
Magazines published in Bangladesh
Bengali-language magazines
Defunct magazines published in Bangladesh
LGBT in Bangladesh
LGBT-related magazines
Magazines established in 2014
Magazines disestablished in 2014